Robert Biket (fl. c. 1175) was the author of Lai du cor ('The Lai of the Horn'), a late-12th-century Anglo-Norman Breton lai. The lai, preserved in a single late-thirteenth-century manuscript in the Bodleian library, tells the story of a drinking-horn which cannot be used by cuckolded husbands without spilling the contents.

References

2. Fein, Susanna, ed. Interpreting MS Digby 86: A Trilingual Book from Thirteenth-Century Worcestershire. Woodbridge: York Medieval Press/Boydell Press, 2019. .

External links
 Robert Biket at arlima.net

Year of birth unknown
Year of death unknown
12th-century English writers
Norman-language poets
12th-century English poets